Strelníky is a village and municipality in Banská Bystrica District in the Banská Bystrica Region of central Slovakia.

History
In historical records the village was first mentioned in 1465.

Geography
The municipality lies at an altitude of 666 metres and covers an area of 17.467 km2. It has a population of about 783 people.

References

External links

Villages and municipalities in Banská Bystrica District